Jack Francis Mendl (6 December 1911 – 27 October 2001) was an Argentine first-class cricketer and educator.

Mendl was born in the Buenos Aires suburb of Hurlingham, where his father was a grain trader. He was sent to England, along with his brother Derek Mendl, where the two were educated at Repton School. From Repton he went up to University College, Oxford to study English and history. He was denied the opportunity to play first-class cricket for Oxford University due to a skiing accident. He debuted in minor counties cricket for Oxfordshire in the 1939 Minor Counties Championship. He served with the South Wales Borderers in the Second World War, enlisting as a second lieutenant.

He began teaching at the Dragon School in Oxford in 1945, and for the next decade he opened the batting for Oxfordshire during the summer holidays. He made 76 appearances for the county in Minor Counties Championship, scoring 5,541 runs at an average of 50.83, with the Oxfordshire player Joe Banton considering him the greatest batsman to have represented the county. He made his debut in first-class cricket when he was selected to play for the Minor Counties cricket team against Yorkshire at Lord's in 1949. He accepted a teaching post in Scotland at the Edinburgh Academy in 1950. He made four first-class appearances for Scotland between 1953 and 1955, as well as appearing a first-class match for the Marylebone Cricket Club against Scotland at Aberdeen in 1957. His most notable innings for Scotland came against Derbyshire, when he scored 65 of Scotland's 100 runs total.

He taught at the Edinburgh Academy until his retirement in 1977, serving as a housemaster of Dundas House from 1962 to 1965 and Mackenzie House from 1965 to 1972. Following his retirement, Mendl remained in the Trinity area of Edinburgh and became a keen golfer. Mendl died at Edinburgh in October 2001. He was survived by his wife Betty, whom he had met shortly after arriving at the Edinburgh Academy and married in 1952, and their two children.

References

External links

1911 births
2001 deaths
Sportspeople from Buenos Aires Province
Argentine emigrants to England
People educated at Repton School
Alumni of University College, Oxford
Argentine cricketers
Oxfordshire cricketers
British Army personnel of World War II
South Wales Borderers officers
Argentine educators
Minor Counties cricketers
Scotland cricketers
Marylebone Cricket Club cricketers